Idunella sketi is a species of crustacean in family Liljeborgiidae. It is endemic to Bermuda.

References

Endemic fauna of Bermuda
Gammaridea
Taxonomy articles created by Polbot
Crustaceans described in 1980